Rule-developing experimentation or  RDE is a systematized solution-oriented business process of experimentation that designs, tests, and modifies alternative ideas, packages, products, or services in a disciplined way using experimental design, so that the developer and marketer discover what appeals to the customer, even if the customer can't articulate the need, much less the solution.

Explanation 
Rule-developing experimentation was developed by Moskowitz Jacobs Inc. in cooperation with Professor Jerry (Yoram) Wind (Wharton School of Business at University of Pennsylvania). The term was initially coined by Howard R. Moskowitz and Alex Gofman in a series of articles and conference papers. The paradigm for systematic design and developing/using the rules in various applications was formalized in their book Selling Blue Elephants: How to Make Great Products That People Want Before They Even Know They Want Them (Wharton School Publishing, 2007).

Some aspects of RDE have previously been used during the past 25 years for the design and optimization of physical products, product development concepts, marketing communications, as well as packaging. Beginning in 1982, RDE was variously described in different books and articles by a number of different terms (e.g., product optimization), depending on the product area and the topics (e.g.). RDE has been effectively utilized over the years by many of Fortune 500 companies around the world.

Areas of application 
Initially, RDE was used for product optimization followed by message optimization for advertising, promotions, etc. New applications of RDE include NDP "NDP is not defined. Could it be a typo for new product development (NPD)? combinatorial innovation, multivariate landing page optimization (MVLPO), political elections, stock markets, crisis communications management, package design, magazine cover, flyer optimization, social science, public policies, etc. – virtually any field that involves people decisions and choices, emotional perceptions of messages and other stimuli. RDE is the foundation for the new science of MindGenomics modeled on the emerging science of genomics and the technology of informatics.

The three roots 

 Experimental psychology – RDE is founded on the realization that perception and behavior are linked in a two-way exchange. RDE uses a variation of conjoint analysis as its statistical basis. 
 Driving power of business – a need to create new products and services that people like, doing so fast and inexpensively 
 The world-view of social science – RDE is related to a field called adaptive experimentation (AE), or adaptive management. The most publicized cases of AE are very lengthy, large-scale, even monumental projects in ecology, theoretical science, or the sociology/environmental area. However, AE doesn't generate rules.

The seven basic steps 

Step 1. Identify groups or classes of features that constitute the target product (offering, etc.) For example, in the case of a credit card offer, the variables could be APRs (annual percentage rates), Rewards Options, and so on. Every such variable (also called a 'silo' or a 'bucket' of ideas) comprises several APRs, Rewards Options, etc.

Step 2. Mix and match the elements according to an experimental design to create a set of prototypes. The second step is usually done automatically by a tool that creates a unique individual design plan for each respondent, allowing for individual models of utilities for each respondent.

Step 3. Show the prototypes to consumers and collect their responses on a rating question (e.g., "How likely would you be to buy this product?").

Step 4. Analyze results using a regression module. One of the key differentiating points of RDE is individual models of utilities for each respondent. This allows patterns discovered in the data, across elements and respondents (Step 6) to generate rules for more targeted optimization as well as uncover all meaningful two-way synergisms and suppressions between the elements. RDE uses dummy variable regression to estimate the absolute values of the utilities, which in turn allows for databasing the results. The database makes for meaningful comparison of the element utilities in one study, and across studies, which then track the consumers' minds across studies and time.

Step 5. Optimize. Uncover the optimal product, find the best combination that has the highest sum of utilities.

Step 6. Identify naturally occurring attitudinal segments of the population that show similar patterns of the utilities.

Step 7. Apply the generated rules to create new products, services, offerings, and so on.

Key advantages 
 The structure of RDE imposes the discipline of thinking resulting in a higher success rate than other methods. Many users report that just preparing for RDE (seven steps above) helps them to better understand the problem and find possible solutions.
 Individual models for each respondent allows for more robust and rich data to generate rules. Some advantages of individual models include:
 Pattern-based discoveries (Step 6, segmentation) to generate rules for more targeted optimization (also called attitudinal segmentation or latent segments)
 Simulate market share and choice analysis
 Discover any and all meaningful pair-wise interactions between the elements
 Analyze how one element 'drives' responses to another element using scenarios (e.g., in case of a category containing brands names, the researcher can compare the utilities of other elements when each of the brands are kept constant).
 RDE uses a variation of dummy variable regression to estimate the absolute values of the utilities, which in turn allows databasing the result for tracking the consumers' minds and easy comparison of the utilities across the categories.

See also 
 Conjoint analysis (healthcare)
 Product positioning
 Marketing research
 Quantitative marketing research

References

External links
 www.SellingBlueElephants.com 
 www.Ideamap.NET 

Market research
Product management
Experiments
Business process